Franca Afegbua (20 October 1943 – 12 March 2023) was a Nigerian beautician and politician who represented Bendel North in the Nigerian Senate in 1983. Elected as a National Party of Nigeria (NPN) senator, she was the first elected woman senator in Nigeria.

Afegbua was born in Okpella, Edo State in 1943 and completed her post-secondary education in Sofia, Bulgaria. Prior to the beginning of the second republic, she worked as a hairdresser in Lagos serving high-income clients. Afegbua had a close relationship with Joseph Tarka, who introduced her to his party, NPN. In 1983, when she announced her intention to make a challenge for a senatorial seat in Bendel, few felt that she could win. Her party was in opposition and the incumbent governor and senator were respected men in the community. But Afegbua, who had won an international hairstyling competition in 1977, strategized that wooing more women to vote could give her a victory. Her victory in the hairstyling competition had made her name popular within her Etsako community; she targeted women voters and as her campaign gained steam it was too late to curb. She earned a slim victory in the August election, defeating John Umolu.

Afegbua died on 12 March 2023, at age 79.

References

1943 births
2023 deaths
Nigerian women in politics
Members of the Senate (Nigeria)
Beauticians
National Party of Nigeria politicians
People from Edo State